Forse Castle is a ruined building dating from 1200 in the hamlet of Forse in the Caithness region in the Scottish council area of Highland. It is protected as a scheduled ancient monument.

The castle stands on a peninsula about 50 metres above sea level. It is surrounded on all sides by steep rocks and is cut off from the mainland by a natural ditch at the neck of the peninsula.

Forse Castle was the stronghold of the Sutherland of Forse family, a cadet branch of the Clan Sutherland. They lived in it until around 1600.

References

Forse
Clan Sutherland
Buildings and structures in Caithness
Scheduled Ancient Monuments in Highland